Col de Port (elevation ) is a mountain pass in the French Pyrenees between Massat and Tarascon-sur-Ariège in the "massif de l'Arize". It links the Couserans and Ariège valleys.

The pass is used occasionally in the Tour de France and is popular with touring cyclists.

The name of the pass is tautological as Col means pass in French and Port means pass in Occitan.

Details of the climb 
The steepest section is 9.2%.

From Massat, the D18 to the south links with the route from Aulus-les-Bains and Vicdessos between the Col d'Agnes and the Port de Lers.

Tour de France 
The Col de Port was first used in the Tour de France in 1910. The first cyclist over the summit was Octave Lapize.

Appearances in the Tour de France (since 1947) 
The Tour de France has crossed the summit 11 times since 1947, including on stage 16 of the 2021 tour. The 15th stage was selected for the 2007 L'Étape du Tour, in which amateur and club riders ride over a full stage of the tour.

References

Mountain passes of Ariège (department)
Mountain passes of the Pyrenees
Transport in Occitania (administrative region)